The apple barkminer (Marmara elotella) is a moth of the family Gracillariidae. It is known from Massachusetts, Connecticut, Kentucky, Maine and Virginia in the United States.

The larvae feed on Pyrus and Malus species, including Malus pumila and Malus sylvestris. They mine the twigs of their host plant. The larvae are sap feeders.

References

Gracillariinae
Moths described in 1909